The M Machine is an American electronic music duo from San Francisco, California, United States, formed in 2011 and currently consisting of Ben Swardlick and Eric Luttrell. They have released four EPs, a single and two remix collections on Skrillex's label Owsla. The group has reached the overall #1 slot on Beatport on multiple occasions.

Music career
The group originally went by the moniker Pance Party. They initially had viral success with a teaser video for their planned full-length album Metropolis, which later became split into two EPs. Their double A-side "Promise Me A Rose Garden" / "Glow" was released on Skrillex's label OWSLA in 2011, becoming the #1 Electro House release on Beatport, and #2 overall release for an entire week. "Promise Me A Rose Garden" was named Hottest Record in the World on October 20, 2011, by Zane Lowe on BBC Radio 1.

In April 2012, the group released Metropolis Pt. I, the first installment of their two-part concept album. Metropolis Pt. I premiered online in Rolling Stone magazine, followed by a worldwide release the next day, reaching number one on the Beatport overall chart. Metropolis Pt. II was released February 19, 2013 on Owsla to critical acclaim, also reaching the number one overall spot on Beatport.

Inspired by Fritz Lang's influential film Metropolis, together the two EPs tell the story of the dystopian city of Metropolis. A text/illustrated version of the story is also available in the form of digital liner notes on the band's website. The Metropolis saga was completed with the release of Metropolis Remixed, a revamped retrospective of the previous two EPs that featured remixes from Kill The Noise, Digitalism, Robotaki, and more.

Also in January 2014, the group released the single "Superflat" on OWSLA, followed by the Just Like EP in November of that year. Just Like signaled a change in direction as the group moved towards more underground, club-oriented sound. A remix pack, Just Like Remixes was released in April 2015 featuring Manila Killa, CRNKN, and Worthy among others.

On January 28, 2015, Andy announced his departure from the group to pursue his interest in programming and technology, making the former trio a duo.

On February 23, 2017, they released their debut album Glare on Mad Zoo.

The group has toured in support of acts including Skrillex, Porter Robinson, The Glitch Mob, Madeon, Markus Schulz, and more, in addition to a slew of their own headline runs. They have also played premier music festivals including Ultra Music Festival, Electric Daisy Carnival, Holy Ship!, Hard Summer, Outside Lands, South by Southwest, TomorrowWorld, Mysteryland, Electric Zoo and Shambhala.

The group has contributed official remixes for Bruno Mars, Passion Pit, Empire of the Sun, Dog Blood, Madeon, Mat Zo, Arty, Datsik & Kill The Noise.

Discography

Studio albums

EPs

Singles

Other appearances

Remixes

References

External links
 The M Machine on Beatport

Alternative dance musical groups
American electronic musicians
Kitsuné artists
Musical groups established in 2011
Musical groups from San Francisco
Owsla artists
2011 establishments in California